Tiffany Mitchell (born September 23, 1994) is an American professional basketball player for the Minnesota Lynx of the Women's National Basketball Association (WNBA). She also currently plays for the Melbourne Boomers of the Women's National Basketball League (WNBL). Mitchell played college basketball for the South Carolina Gamecocks, where she was a two-time SEC Player of the Year. After concluding her collegiate career, she was selected ninth overall in the 2016 WNBA draft by the Indiana Fever. During the WNBA off-seasons, Mitchell has played overseas in Russia, Turkey, Israel and Australia.

College career
Between 2012 and 2016, Mitchell played college basketball for the South Carolina Gamecocks. In 2014 and 2015, she was named the SEC Player of the Year.

College statistics
Source

Professional career

WNBA
Mitchell was selected ninth overall in the 2016 WNBA draft by the Indiana Fever. She scored a game-high 18 points for the Fever in her WNBA debut. She played all 34 games during the 2016 season and averaged 8.6 points per game, earning a place in the WNBA All-Rookie Team. In 2021, she played her sixth season for the Fever.

Overseas
In her first WNBA off-season, Mitchell played for Nadezhda Orenburg of the Russian Women's Basketball Premier League during the 2016–17 season.

Mitchell's next overseas stint came during the 2018–19 season. She started the season in Turkey with Mersin Büyükşehir Belediyespor, later joining OGM Ormanspor in December 2018. She left OGM Ormanspor in January 2019 and in March 2019 joined Elitzur Ramla in Israel.

Mitchell returned to Elitzur Ramla for the 2019–20 and 2020–21 seasons.

For the 2021–22 season, Mitchell moved to Australia to play for the Melbourne Boomers of the Women's National Basketball League (WNBL). The Boomers won the WNBL title in that season, Mitchell scoring 16 points in the deciding game against Perth.

WNBA career statistics

Regular season

|-
| style="text-align:left;"| 2016
| style="text-align:left;"| Indiana
| 34 || 8 || 20.0 || .361 || .294 || .911 || 1.7 || 1.4 || 0.9 || 0.1 || 1.6 || 8.6
|-
| style="text-align:left;"| 2017
| style="text-align:left;"| Indiana
| 27 || 9 || 24.9 || .349 || .246 || .922 || 3.2 || 1.4 || 1.1 || 0.2 || 1.5 || 10.3
|-
| style="text-align:left;"| 2018
| style="text-align:left;"| Indiana
| 34 || 20 || 25.6 || .371 || .267 || .835 || 3.1 || 2.3 || 0.9 || 0.2 || 1.4 || 9.1
|-
| style="text-align:left;"| 2019
| style="text-align:left;"| Indiana
| 33 || 14 || 25.2 || .381 || .290 || .892 || 2.9 || 2.2 || 0.6 || 0.1 || 1.7 || 9.7
|-
| style="text-align:left;"| 2020
| style="text-align:left;"| Indiana
| 19 || 11 || 26.4 || .346 || .233 || .951 || 3.4 || 2.6 || 0.6 || 0.1 || 2.4 || 12.7
|-
| style="text-align:left;"| 2021
| style="text-align:left;"| Indiana
| 28 || 25 || 27.3 || .421 || .255 || .880 || 2.9 || 2.0 || 0.6 || 0.0 || 1.9 || 12.0
|-
| style="text-align:left;"| 2022
| style="text-align:left;"| Indiana
| 34 || 8 || 16.3 || .451 || .387 || .865 || 1.2 || 1.2 || 0.8 || 0.1 || 0.9 || 6.5
|-
| style='text-align:left;'| Career
| style='text-align:left;'| 7 years, 1 team
| 209 || 95 || 23.3 || .381 || .374 || .895 || 2.5 || 1.8 || 0.8 || 0.1 || 1.6 || 9.6

Postseason

|-
| style="text-align:left;"| 2016
| style="text-align:left;"| Indiana
| 1 || 0 || 10.0 || .200 || .000 || .000 || 0.0 || 0.0 || 0.0 || 0.0 || 1.0 || 2.0
|-
| style='text-align:left;'| Career
| style='text-align:left;'| 1 year, 1 team
| 1 || 0 || 10.0 || .200 || .000 || .000 || 0.0 || 0.0 || 0.0 || 0.0 || 1.0 || 2.0

References

External links 
 WNBA profile
 South Carolina Gamecocks bio

1994 births
Living people
All-American college women's basketball players
American expatriate basketball people in Australia
American expatriate basketball people in Israel
American expatriate basketball people in Turkey
American expatriate basketball people in Russia
American women's 3x3 basketball players
American women's basketball players
Basketball players at the 2015 Pan American Games
Basketball players from Charlotte, North Carolina
Indiana Fever draft picks
Indiana Fever players
Medalists at the 2015 Pan American Games
Melbourne Boomers players
Pan American Games medalists in basketball
Pan American Games silver medalists for the United States
Parade High School All-Americans (girls' basketball)
Shooting guards
South Carolina Gamecocks women's basketball players